Gavin Lee (born 15 October 1971) is an English actor who has appeared on the stage in musical theatre, notably as Bert in the musical Mary Poppins, in both the West End and on Broadway, and as Squidward Tentacles in the original Broadway cast of SpongeBob SquarePants: The Musical.

Early life
Lee is an alumnus of the Doreen Bird College of Performing Arts after which he has been involved in various musicals as a performer and choreographer.

Career
Lee appeared in the dance play Contact in the West End at the Queen's Theatre, opening in October 2002.

In 2004, Lee auditioned to be the Bert understudy in the London production of Mary Poppins, but won the role outright. He originated the role of Bert in the original West End production.  He also starred as Bert in the Broadway production of Mary Poppins. He was chosen for the Broadway role because of his critically acclaimed performance as Bert in the West End production. He departed the Broadway production after nearly two years to launch the US National Tour, but returned to the Broadway production in August 2010 until January 2013. Lee was nominated for Best Performance by an Actor in a Musical at the 2005 Olivier Awards and the 2005 Theatregoer's Choice Awards for originating the West End role of Bert. For his Broadway performance, Lee was nominated for the 2006 Outer Critics Circle Awards (Outstanding Actor in a Musical) and the 2007 Tony Award for Best Leading Actor in a Musical. He also won the 2007 Drama Desk Award for Featured Actor in a Musical and an award for Outstanding Broadway Debut at the 63rd annual Theatre World Awards. In August 2007, Lee was added to Sardi's caricature gallery with other Broadway actors.

In June 2008, Lee performed in a concert version of Show Boat at Carnegie Hall as
Frank Schultz. He has performed as part of Andrew Lloyd Webber's The Phantom of the Opera film adaptation, appearing as one of the singers/dancers in the "Masquerade" scene.

Lee and former London co-star Laura Michelle Kelly performed as Bert and Mary Poppins in the America Celebrates 4 July at Fords Theatre in front of President Barack Obama and First Lady Michelle Obama on 6 June 2010. The special aired on 2 July 2010 on ABC. Lee again reunited with Kelly when he returned to the role of Bert in the Broadway production of Mary Poppins on 24 August 2010.

He took over the role of Jerry Travers in the West End production of Top Hat beginning 5 February 2013. He joined the Broadway revival of Les Miserables as Thenardier beginning 3 March 2015.

Lee played Squidward Tentacles in SpongeBob SquarePants, the Broadway Musical. The stage musical premiered at the Oriental Theatre in Chicago, Illinois, and ran from June to July 2016. Lee reprised his role as Squidward for the Broadway run of the musical, starting with November 2017 previews at the Palace Theatre and remaining until it closed in September 2018. Lee was nominated for a Tony Award for Best Featured Actor in a Musical for his role as Squidward.

In June 2019, he appeared at Paper Mill Playhouse in Millburn, New Jersey, taking on the role of Lumiere in Beauty and the Beast. He reprised the role in the 2021 UK tour. The production then transferred to the West End's London Palladium for a limited engagement beginning June 2022.

On February 17, 2020, he performed the Manhattan Concert Productions' 50th-anniversary celebration of Joseph and the Amazing Technicolor Dreamcoat at David Geffen Hall, Lincoln Center. He played the Butler.

Lee returned to the Paper Mill Playhouse to play Max Detweiler in its production of The Sound of Music from December 2–January 1, 2023.

Personal life
Lee is married to Emily Harvey, an American actress who was playing the role of Mme Firmin in London's The Phantom of the Opera during his own run in London in Mary Poppins. They have 3 children.

Theatre appearances

Cast recordings
 Mary Poppins
 A Saint She Ain't
 Zip Goes a Million
 Saturday Night
 SpongeBob SquarePants (musical)

Filmography
 Beyond the Sea
 The Phantom of the Opera

Television
 White Collar – Alan Woodford (5 episodes)
 The Good Wife – Jake Alister (Season 2, Episode 18 "Killer Song", 2011)
 Law & Order: Special Victims Unit – Dennis Griscomb (2 episodes)
 The SpongeBob Musical: Live on Stage! – Squidward Tentacles (reprising his role from the Broadway musical)
 Little America – Henry (Season 1, Episode 4)

Awards and nominations

Tony Awards
Note: The year given is the year of the ceremony

Drama Desk Awards
Note: The year given is the year of the ceremony

Laurence Olivier Awards
Note: The year given is the year of the ceremony

References

External links
 
 

1971 births
Drama Desk Award winners
English male musical theatre actors
Living people
Alumni of Bird College
Theatre World Award winners